The giant wall gecko (Tarentola gigas) is a species of gecko in the family Phyllodactylidae. The species is endemic to Cape Verde, where it occurs on the island of São Nicolau and on the nearby islets of Branco and Raso. The species was named by José Vicente Barbosa du Bocage in 1875.

There are two subspecies:
Tarentola gigas brancoensis 
Tarentola gigas gigas

Description
The giant wall gecko reaches maximum 15.5 cm snout–vent length and its dorsal skin has a grey color.

References

Further reading

 Bocage 1875 : 2. Sur deux reptiles nouveaux de l’Archipel du Cap-Vert [On Two New Reptiles of the Cape Verde Archipelago]. Jornal de Sciencias Mathematicas, Physicas e Naturaes (Journal of Science, Mathematics, Physrics and Nature), Lisbon, vol. 5, p. 108-112
Carranza, S., Arnold, E. Nicholas; Mateo, J. A. and L. F. López-Jurado 2000 Long-distance colonization and radiation in gekkonid lizards, Tarentola (Reptilia: Gekkonidae), revealed by mitochondrial DNA sequences. Proc. R. Soc. London B 267: 637-649
Schleich, 1984 : Die Geckos der Gattung Tarentola der Kapverden (Reptilia: Sauria: Gekkonidae) [Geckos of the Tarentola Species in Cape Verde]. Courier Forschungsinstitut Senckenberg, vol. 68, p. 95-106. 
Schleich, H.H. 1987 Herpetofauna caboverdiana. Spixiana Suppl. (no. 12) p. 75
Schleich H H 1988 ''Ascalabotes gigas BOCAGE 1875 (currently Tarentola gigas); proposed conservation of the specific name, by suppression of the senior synonym Tarentola borneensis Gray 1845. Bull. Zool. Nomencl. 45
Jesus, J.; Brehm, A. & Harris, D.J. 2002 Relationships of Tarentola (Reptilia: Gekkonidae) from the Cape Verde Islands estimated from DNA sequence data. Amphibia-Reptilia 23 (1): 47-54
Joger U 1993 On two collections of reptiles and amphibians from the Cape Verde Islands, with descriptions of three new taxa. Courier Forschungsinstitut Senckenberg 159: 437-444
Joger, U. 1984 Die Radiation der Gattung Tarentola in Makaronesien. Courier Forschungsinstitut Senckenberg 71: 91-111

gigas
Geckos of Africa
Endemic vertebrates of Cape Verde
Fauna of São Nicolau, Cape Verde
Reptiles described in 1875
Taxa named by José Vicente Barbosa du Bocage